Podulaka is a small settlement west of Velike Lašče in central Slovenia. The entire Municipality of Velike Lašče is part of the traditional Lower Carniola region and is now included in the Central Slovenia Statistical Region.

References

External links
Podulaka on Geopedia

Populated places in the Municipality of Velike Lašče